Sam Ash Music was founded in 1924, and is the largest family-owned chain of musical instrument stores in the United States, with 44 locations in 16 states.  With corporate headquarters in Hicksville, New York, Sam Ash sells musical instruments, recording equipment, DJ and lighting equipment, and professional sound.

History

Early years
Musician Sam Ash and his wife Rose, whose families had emigrated from Eastern Europe to Brooklyn, New York when they were children, opened what would become the first Sam Ash Music Store in 1924 as a way to transform Sam's work as a violin teacher and gigging musician in the Sam Ash Orchestra into steady income. Over the next ten years Sam and Rose had three children, Jerome (Jerry), Paul, and Marcia, who all took an active role in the family business. 

In 1944 the Ash family moved their business to a new Brooklyn location on 236 Utica Avenue, gradually expanding the store's initial offering beyond sheet music, music instrument repairs, and phonographs, and capitalizing on area school music programs by delivering sheet music and stocking a growing selection of band instruments. In the 1950s as rhythm and blues and rock and roll gained popularity, Sam Ash was among the first stores in the area to add guitar brands like Gibson and Fender, as well as a record shop begun under the supervision of 15-year old Paul, which at one point accounted for nearly half the store's overall revenue.

Multi-store growth
Sam declined his son's requests to expand the original store to additional locations, but in 1961, five years after his death, Paul and Jerry (now company president and chairman, respectively) expanded into Long Island and Westchester County, opening new stores in Hempstead, Huntington and White Plains. By 1990, there were eight Sam Ash Music stores in the New York area, and in 1992 the first Sam Ash Music store outside the New York area opened in Cherry Hill, New Jersey.

West 48th Street's Music Row
In 1969, the company established a presence in Midtown Manhattan on West 48th Street's Music Row, a location they gradually expanded. By the late 1980s, after acquiring several struggling competitors, Sam Ash Music's presence dominated the block with an amalgamation of six storefronts with 12 entrances in nine buildings on both sides of the street. In 1999, the company acquired 64-year Music Row mainstay Manny's Music, which they continued to operate under the same name and management. In 2012, facing rising rents and redevelopment on Sam Ash Music relocated the flagship 48th street store to a new location at 333 West 34th Street.

Third Generation
Following Paul's death in 2014, management shifted to a third generation of Ash family, Jerry's sons David, Richard, and Sammy. Sam Ash Music remains family-owned, with a fourth generation of family members already employed by the company.

References

External links

 Company Website
 The Sam Ash Story
 NAMM Oral Histories: Jerry Ash
 NAMM Oral Histories: Bernice Ash
 NAMM Oral Histories: Paul Ash
 NAMM Oral Histories: Sammy Ash

Companies based in New York (state)
Musical instrument retailers of the United States
Retail companies established in 1924
1924 establishments in New York City
Privately held companies of the United States
Family-owned companies of the United States